Mika Schwann (born 30 July 1999) is an Austrian ski jumper and representative of the club KSG Klagenfurt–Kärten. He won with team silver medal at the 2018 Nordic Junior World Ski Championships and bronze medal at the 2017 Nordic Junior World Ski Championships.

References

1999 births
Living people
Austrian male ski jumpers